Economic Notes : Review of Banking, Finance and Monetary Economics is a biannual academic journal published by John Wiley & Sons. The journal was established in 1948. The journal publishes articles in the fields of banking, finance and monetary economics.

External links 
 

Wiley-Blackwell academic journals
English-language journals
Publications established in 1999
Economics journals
Biannual journals